Multiverse United is an upcoming professional wrestling pay-per-view (PPV) event co-produced by Impact Wrestling and New Japan Pro-Wrestling (NJPW) as a part of WrestleCon. It will take place on March 30, 2023, at the Globe Theater in Los Angeles, California.

The event is the second Multiverse event promoted by Impact during WrestleMania Weekend as part of WrestleCon, following Multiverse of Matches in 2022, thus establishing the Multiverse event as an annual tradition.

Background 
On February 9, 2023, Impact Wrestling and New Japan Pro-Wrestling (NJPW) announced they were co-producing an event as part of that year's WrestleCon called Multiverse United: Only the Strong Survive, taking place at the Globe Theater on Thursday, March 30, 2023, airing live on FITE.

Matches

References

External links 
 

2023 Impact Wrestling pay-per-view events
2023 in Los Angeles
2023 in professional wrestling
Events in Los Angeles
March 2023 events in the United States
Professional wrestling in Los Angeles
Professional wrestling joint events
Scheduled professional wrestling shows